The Vidya Nidhi is a Sri Lankan national honour awarded "for meritorious scientific and technological achievements". It is conventionally used as a title or prefix to the awardee's name. Vidya Nidhi ranks lower than Sri Lanka Sikhamani.

Awardees
Awardees include:

1993

 Dr. (Vidya Nidhi, Vidya Shekara, Chudamani)  Abhayasinghe Arachchige Stephen Abhayasinghe

1998
 Norman Rienzie de Silva 
 S. K. Sayakkara 
 Prematilake Wijesekera

2005
 Angulugaha Gamage Lasath Namal Gamage
 C. A. N. Fernando
 Chales Santiapillai
 H. H. Subasinghe
 M. A. K. L. Dissanayake
 Nimal Guanthilake
 Niriellage Chandrasiri
 P. Amitha Jayasinghe
 Raja Gnanasiri Hewa Bowala
 Shanthi Mendis
 S. M. H. Sena Banda
 V. Kumar
 W. P. Siripala
2017
 Sarath Somasiri Gunawardhana
 Don Tilak Dias Jayaweera Abeysekera
 Sivalingam Sivananthan
 Ahmed Mumtaz Masoon Cassim
 Herath Peruma Mudiyanselage Gunasena
 Lekamage Ramsay Lloyd Perera
 Mariapillai Sellamuthu Pillai Mookiah
 Somasundaram Sandarasegaram
 Vithanage Nimal Chandrasiri Gunasekera
 Wanninayake Mudiyanselage Tikiri Banda Wanninayake

References

External links

 
Civil awards and decorations of Sri Lanka